Daniel Birrell (born 4 April 2000) is a cricketer who plays for Jersey. In November 2019, he was named in Jersey's squad for the Cricket World Cup Challenge League B tournament in Oman. He made his List A debut, for Jersey against Bermuda, on 11 December 2019.

In October 2021, Birrell was named in Jersey's Twenty20 International (T20I) squad for the Regional Final of the 2021 ICC Men's T20 World Cup Europe Qualifier tournament. He made his T20I debut on 17 October 2021, for Jersey against Denmark.

References

External links
 

2000 births
Living people
Jersey cricketers
Jersey Twenty20 International cricketers
Place of birth missing (living people)